The Autovía A-7 (also called Autovia del Mediterráneo) is a Spanish autovía (toll-free limited-access highway) which starts in La Jonquera, near the French frontier and ends in Algeciras.
It was finally finished in late 2015 upon completion of sections west of Almeria and around Motril, is a free alternate route to the tolled Autopista AP-7, and is the longest national motorway in Europe.

Sections

Major cities crossed

See also
N-340 road (Spain)

External links
Autovía A-7 in Google Maps

A-7
A-7
A-7
A-7
A-7